Anthony Painter (born 11 June 1965) is an Australian professional golfer.

Painter was born in Milton, New South Wales. He turned professional in 1985.

Painter played on the PGA Tour of Australasia, winning twice: at the 1993 Meru Valley Perak Masters and the 1996 Schweppes Coolum Classic. He played on the Nationwide Tour from 1998 to 2002 and 2004 to 2006. He won once, at the 1998 Nike Ozarks Open. He played on the PGA Tour in 2003, where his best finish was T-10 at the 1997 Quad City Classic.

Professional wins (4)

PGA Tour of Australasia wins (2)

Nike Tour wins (1)

Australasian Development Tour wins (1)

See also
2002 PGA Tour Qualifying School graduates

External links

Australian male golfers
PGA Tour golfers
PGA Tour of Australasia golfers
Sportsmen from New South Wales
People from Tamworth, New South Wales
1965 births
Living people